Parastichy, in phyllotaxy, is the spiral pattern of particular plant organs on some plants, such as areoles on cacti stems, florets in sunflower heads and scales in pine cones.  These spirals involve the insertion of a single primordium.

See also
 Embryology
 
 Gerrit van Iterson
 
 Phyllotaxis

References

External links 
Smith College, Spiral Lattices & Parastichy
 Interactive Parastichies Explorer

Plant morphology